Coryssovalva cosmocosta is a species of moth of the family Tortricidae. It is found in Colombia.

References

Moths described in 1987
Euliini
Moths of South America
Taxa named by Józef Razowski